Copake Falls Methodist Episcopal Church, also known as the Copake Iron Works Methodist Church, is a historic Methodist Episcopal church located at Copake Falls, Columbia County, New York.  It was built in 1891–1892, and is a one-story, Gothic Revival style light frame church sheathed in novelty siding.  It has a steep gable roof topped by a belfry and a projecting front vestibule.  The building housed a church until 1955.  It houses the Roeliff Jansen Historical Society.

It was added to the National Register of Historic Places in 2012.

References

External links
 Roeliff Jansen Historical Society

United Methodist churches in New York (state)
History museums in New York (state)
Churches on the National Register of Historic Places in New York (state)
Gothic Revival church buildings in New York (state)
Churches completed in 1892
Churches in Columbia County, New York
Museums in Columbia County, New York
National Register of Historic Places in Columbia County, New York